Dave West (May 12, 1928 - December 23, 2005) was a Canadian football player who played for the Toronto Argonauts, Calgary Stampeders, Winnipeg Blue Bombers, Edmonton Eskimos, Hamilton Tiger-Cats and Ottawa Rough Riders. He won the Grey Cup with Eskimos in 1954 and 1955, and with the Rough Riders in 1960. He attended the University of Tulsa. West retired to Coquitlam, British Columbia and was working at a school library in 1984.

References

1928 births
2005 deaths
Calgary Stampeders players
Edmonton Elks players
Hamilton Tiger-Cats players
Ottawa Rough Riders players
Toronto Argonauts players
Tulsa Golden Hurricane football players
Winnipeg Blue Bombers players